Mohawk Village (also called Jericho) is an unincorporated community in Coshocton County, in the U.S. state of Ohio.

History
Mohawk Village was laid out in 1859 as a center for the manufacturing of coal oil. The community took its name from nearby Mohawk Run.

References

Unincorporated communities in Coshocton County, Ohio
Unincorporated communities in Ohio